Åke Fridell (23 June 1919 – 26 August 1985) was a Swedish film actor. He was born in Gävle, Sweden and died in Stockholm.

Selected filmography

 The Old Clock at Ronneberga (1944) - Legal clerk at the mayor's party
 Flickan och djävulen (1944) - Young Man at the Harvest Celebration (uncredited)
 We Need Each Other (1944) - Secretary
 It Rains on Our Love (1946) - Reverend
 When the Meadows Blossom (1946) - Emil Nicklasson
 Iris and the Lieutenant (1946) - Officer (uncredited)
 Onda ögon (1947) - Sven
 Soldier's Reminder (1947) - Åkesson
 A Ship to India (1947) - Variety hall owner
 I Am with You (1948) - Carlsson
 Lars Hård (1948) - Sadistic Prison Guard
 Robinson in Roslagen (1948) - Constable (uncredited)
 Främmande hamn (1948) - Steward
 Vagabond Blacksmiths (1949) - Jernberg
 The Street (1949) - Gustaf Persson
 Prison (1949) - Man at the Boarding-house (uncredited)
 Kvinnan som försvann (1949) - Lövdahl
 Sjösalavår (1949) - Karl Oscar
 Only a Mother (1949) - Inspector
 Stora Hoparegränd och himmelriket (1949) - Bister
 Number 17 (1949) - Brandt
 Two Stories Up (1950) - Caretaker
 Restaurant Intim (1950) - Restaurant guest (uncredited)
 Jack of Hearts (1950) - Berra
 When Love Came to the Village (1950) - Johan
 Regementets ros (1950) - Officer Knislund
 Miss Julie (1951) - Robert
 A Ghost on Holiday (1951) - Bovén, agronomist
 Dårskapens hus (1951) - Ordförande i Föreningen för Fornfilmsforskning
 Stronger Than the Law (1951) - Mattias
 In Lilac Time (1952) - Doctor
 Farlig kurva (1952) - Sternberg
 Summer with Monika (1953) - Ludwig Eriksson, Monikas far
 Ursula, the Girl from the Finnish Forests (1953) - Kåre Flatten
 Barabbas (1953) - Eliahu, Robber, Barabbas' Father
 Sawdust and Tinsel (1953) - Artillery Officer (uncredited)
 Luffaren och Rasmus (1955) - Policeman
 Smiles of a Summer Night (1955) - Frid the Groom
 Night Child (1956) - Eva's Father
 The Biscuit (1956) - Filip Schöling
 The Seventh Seal (1957) - Blacksmith Plog
 A Dreamer's Journey (1957) - Terje
 Amor i telefonen (1957) - Direktør Svensson
 Wild Strawberries (1957) - Karin's lover
 A Goat in the Garden (1958) - David Jespersson
 Rabies (1958, TV Movie) - Sixten Garberg
 The Magician (1958) - Tubal
 A Lion in Town (1959) - Circus Director
 Av hjärtans lust (1960) - Sjöberg
 Kärlekens decimaler (1960) - Edgar Temmelin
 Pärlemor (1961) - Marcus Wæbel
 Chans (1962) - Uncle
 Nils Holgerssons underbara resa (1962) - Dog on Leash (voice)
 Mordvapen till salu (1963) - Rovan
 Svenska bilder (1964) - Industrialist Kronvall
 Drömpojken (1964) - Pettersson
 Pang i bygget (1965) - Teobald Grym
 Träfracken (1966) - Bertil Durell
 Here Is Your Life (1966) - Nicke Larsson
 Komedi i Hägerskog (1968) - Gunnarsson
 Mej och dej (1969) - Customs Officer
 Kameleonterna (1969) - Superintendent
 Kyrkoherden (1970) - Mr. Paular
 The Emigrants (1971) - Aron på Nybacken
 Dagmars Heta Trosor (1971)
 Sängkamrater (1974) - Ollie / Paul's father
 Garaget (1975) - Nancy's father

References

External links

1919 births
1985 deaths
People from Gävle
20th-century Swedish male actors